Kochi Rajavu (translated as King of Kochi) is a 2005  Indian Malayalam-language action comedy film directed by Johny Antony and written by the Udayakrishna-Siby K. Thomas duo. It stars Dileep in the lead role with Kavya Madhavan, Rambha, Harisree Ashokan, Murali, Jagathy Sreekumar and Vijayaraghavan in supporting roles.

The film marks the second collaboration between Dileep, Johny Antony, and the writing duo Udaykrishna–Sibi K. Thomas after C.I.D. Moosa (2003).

Plot

The film starts with Suryanarayana Varma a.k.a. Unni, who hails from a royal family, returning from prison. He had killed the son of a large family who are now searching for him. Unni's parents enroll him in a law college in Chennai. There he meets Meenakshi and gets into conflicts her brother Siva, and Siva's enemy Muthu. Meenakshi eventually falls in love with Unni. Once Meenaskshi's family finds out about her love for Unni they visit his house for a marriage request. But Unni has a past he can't escape, which he narrates in a flashback.

He tells how he met and fell in love with a woman named Aswathy. Aswathy's parents are dead, and she lives with her uncles, the eldest of whom wants to gain her inheritance by arranging a marriage between his son and Aswathy. Aswathy accidentally gets into the autorickshaw of Unni when she is going to meet her future husband. During the ride, Unni falls in love with her and delays bringing Aswathy to her destination.

She becomes fed up with him and decides to tell her uncle. She and her uncle plan to make fun of him and calls Unni to her house. Unni learns that Aswathy's uncle is the auto company owner and they beat him badly. She falls for him when she sees him being injured. They decide to get married and in the drama that follows Unni kills Aswathy's future husband. For this, he is jailed for 5 years.

In the present day, Unni's father makes him believe Aswathy has been married off, so he gets engaged to Meenakshi. Meanwhile, Aswathy calls Unni, telling him that she is still waiting for him. He goes to Kerala to find her, and tries to escape with her in a truck. Chased by Aswathy's family and Meenakshi's family they are saved finally by the autorickshaw drivers and get married.

Cast

Release
The film was released on 14 April 2005 coinciding with Vishu. The film received positive response on its release

Box office
The film was blockbuster at the box office. The film collected ₹2.804 crore from three days at the box office.

Music

Music : Vidyasagar. Vidyasagar later adapted the song "Munthiri Padam" in Tamil as "Aruviyoda" for the film Pasa Kiligal.

Lyrics : Thunchath Ramanujan Ezhuthachan

References

External links 
 

2000s Malayalam-language films
2005 films
Films scored by Vidyasagar
Indian action comedy films
Films shot in Kochi
Films shot in Chennai
Indian prison films
Films directed by Johny Antony